Bartłomiej Józef Szrajber (born 27 May 1954, in Warsaw) is a Polish politician, member of Law and Justice party. He was elected to Sejm on 25 September 2005.

References

1954 births
Living people
Politicians from Warsaw
Law and Justice politicians
Members of the Sejm